Sinead Kavanagh is an Irish female mixed martial artist who competes in the Featherweight division of the Bellator MMA. Fight Matrix had her ranked #10 Women's Featherweight from April 2021 till July 2021, and March 2022. She is currently ranked #8 in the World. As of February 7, 2023, she is #10 in the Bellator Women's pound-for-pound Rankings and #3 in the Bellator Women's Featherweight Rankings.

Background
Kavanagh is the middle child in a family of five siblings. She was a tomboy growing up. At eight years old, she started training stand-up disciplines including karate, boxing and kickboxing. She continued in these for many years, and had a desire to pursue martial arts further.

While still in high school, Kavanagh gave birth to her son Leon, however Leon's father died. She had a tough upbringing, with her mother forming a drinking habit after her brother and sister were killed in a car crash, and becoming homeless at a young age.

Kavanagh became a five-time national boxing champion, and competed alongside Katie Taylor on the Irish team that went to the World Championships in 2012. But after losing multiple fights, she decided to quit the sport.

Mixed martial arts career

Early career
In 2015, Kavanagh made it to the finals of the International Mixed Martial Arts Federation (IMMAF) World Championships, losing to Canadian fighter Jamie Herrington when the referee jumped in and stopped the fight in the third round. Afterwards, Herrington contacted her on Facebook to admit that she had failed a drug test and offered her apologies.

Kavanagh made her professional MMA debut against Hatice Özyurt at BAMMA 22: Duquesnoy vs. Loughnane on September 19, 2015, defeating Ozyurt via TKO 17 seconds into the bout.

Next up was future UFC fighter Zarah Fairn Dos Santos at BAMMA 24: Ireland vs. England on February 26, 2016. She won the close bout via split decision.

From there, Kavanagh secured her third consecutive win against Polish fighter Katarzyna Sadura BAMMA 26: Saadeh vs. Young, which she won via KO in the first round.

She was rewarded by being signed to Bellator MMA before their show in Dublin towards the end of 2016 and has been with the promotion ever since.

Bellator MMA
Kavanagh made her Bellator debut against Elina Kallionidou at Bellator 169 on December 16, 2016; she won the bout by unanimous decision.  She faced Iony Razafiarison on February 24, 2017 at Bellator 173, losing by unanimous decision.  Kavanagh returned to face former Australian boxing champ Arlene Blencowe on 25 August 2017 at Bellator 182. She lost the fight via split decision.  She later defeated Maria Casanova via TKO at Bellator 187 on November 10, 2017.

Kavanagh faced Janay Harding at Bellator 207 on October 12, 2018. She lost the bout after it was stopped due to a cut.  She was scheduled to face Olga Rubin at Bellator 217, however she pulled out of the bout due to injury.  She faced Leslie Smith in her promotional debut at Bellator 224 on July 12, 2019. She lost the fight by majority decision.  The bout against Olga Rubin was rebooked for Bellator 234 on November 15, 2019. She won the bout via TKO in the second round.

Kavanagh won a bout with Katharina Lehner at Bellator Milan 3 on October 3, 2020, by unanimous decision.

Kavanagh fought for the Bellator Women's Featherweight Championship against Cris Cyborg on November 12, 2021 at Bellator 271. After exchanging on the feet, Kavanagh was knockout out early in the first round.

Kavanagh faced Leah McCourt on February 25, 2022 at Bellator 275. Even though she injured her knee during the bout, Kavanagh won the bout via unanimous decision.

Kavanagh faced Janay Harding in a rematch on February 25, 2023 at Bellator 291. She won the fight by unanimous decision.

Mixed martial arts record

|-
|Win
|align=center|9–5
|Janay Harding
|Decision (unanimous)
|Bellator 291
|
|align=center|3
|align=center|5:00
|Dublin, Ireland
|
|-
|Win
|align=center| 8–5
|Leah McCourt
|Decision (unanimous)
|Bellator 275 
|
|align=center|3
|align=center|5:00
|Dublin, Ireland
|
|-
| Loss
| align=center| 7–5
| Cris Cyborg
| KO (punches)
| Bellator 271
| 
| align=center|1 
| align=center|1:32
| Hollywood, Florida, United States
|
|-
| Win
| align=center| 7–4
| Katharina Lehner
| Decision (unanimous)
| Bellator Milan 3
| 
| align=center| 3
| align=center| 5:00
| Milan, Italy
| 
|-
| Win
| align=center| 6–4
| Olga Rubin
|TKO (punches)
| Bellator 234
| 
|align=center| 2
|align=center| 4:37
| Tel Aviv, Israel
|
|-
| Loss
| align=center|5–4
| Leslie Smith
|Decision (majority)
|Bellator 224
|
|align=center|3
|align=center|5:00
|Thackerville, Oklahoma, United States
|
|-
| Loss
| align=center|5–3
| Janay Harding
|TKO (cut)
| Bellator 207
| 
| align=center|1
| align=center|5:00
| Uncasville, Connecticut, United States
|
|-
| Win
| align=center| 5–2
| Maria Casanova
| TKO (punches)
|Bellator 187
|
| align=center|1
| align=center|0:34
| Dublin, Ireland
| 
|-
| Loss
| align=center| 4–2
| Arlene Blencowe
|Decision (split)
|Bellator 182
|
|align=center|3
|align=center|5:00
|Verona, New York, United States
| 
|-
| Loss
| align=center| 4–1
| Iony Razafiarison
|Decision (unanimous)
|Bellator 173
|
|align=center|3
|align=center|5:00
|Belfast, Northern Ireland
| 
|-
| Win
| align=center| 4–0
| Elina Kallionidou
|Decision (unanimous)
| Bellator 169
| 
|align=center|3
|align=center|5:00
|Dublin, Ireland
| 
|-
| Win
| align=center| 3–0
| Katarzyna Sadura
| KO (punches)
|BAMMA 26: Saadeh vs. Young
|
| align=center| 1
| align=center| 2:46
| Dublin, Ireland
| 
|-
| Win
| align=center| 2–0
| Zarah Fairn Dos Santos
| Decision (split)
| BAMMA 24: Ireland vs. England
| 
| align=center|3
| align=center| 5:00
| Dublin, Ireland
|
|-
| Win
| align=center| 1–0
| Hatice Özyurt
| TKO (punches)
| BAMMA 22: Duquesnoy vs. Loughnane
| 
| align=center| 1
| align=center| 0:17
| Dublin, Ireland
|

See also 
 List of current Bellator fighters
 List of female mixed martial artists

References

External links 
  
 

Living people
Irish female mixed martial artists
Featherweight mixed martial artists
Mixed martial artists utilizing boxing
Mixed martial artists utilizing karate
Irish women boxers
Irish female karateka
Bellator female fighters
1986 births